Mannaja (also known as A Man Called Blade) is an Italian 1977 Spaghetti Western film directed by Sergio Martino. The main role, Blade, is played by Maurizio Merli. Other central roles are played by John Steiner, Sonja Jeannine, Donald O'Brien, Philippe Leroy and Martine Brochard.

Plot
Bounty hunter Blade (Maurizio Merli), who uses a tomahawk as a throwing weapon, arrives at the mining town of Suttonville with the outlaw Burt Craven (Donald O'Brien) as his prisoner. His real motive is to kill mining big boss McGowan (Philippe Leroy) who has killed his father. Blade gives up his revenge – because McGowan “is not worth it” – and instead accepts to deliver the ransom for the mine owner's daughter (Sonja Jeannine). However, this mission fails because she turns out to be the lover of her kidnapper, McGowan's foreman Voller (John Steiner), who secretly works for a gang that regularly robs the shipments of silver from the mine. Voller then kills his boss and turns his mining empire into bloody chaos by massacring the mine workers. Blade is beaten up and buried up to his neck and left to be blinded by the sun. However, he survives and returns for a showdown with Voller.

Cast
Maurizio Merli as Blade (Mannaja)
John Steiner as Theo Voller
Sonja Jeannine as Deborah McGowan
Donald O'Brien as Burt Craven
Philippe Leroy as Ed McGowan
Martine Brochard as Angela
Salvatore Puntillo as Johnny
Antonio Casale as Dahlman
Enzo Fiermonte as agente del governo
Rick Battaglia as padre di Mannaja
Aldo Rendine as uomo derubato
Enzo Maggio as vecchietto
Sergio Tardioli as barista
Sophia Lombardo as Lucy

Music
The film's score was composed and performed by Guido & Maurizio De Angelis, whose soundtrack has been described as "[veering] unpredictability between Italian Western ballads, contemporary pop songs, synth-led horror motifs and 1970s prog rock".

Release
Mannaja was released in 1977. It grossed a 750 million Italian lire domestically in Italy.

It was released on DVD by Blue Underground.

Reception
In his investigation of narrative structures in Spaghetti Western films, Fridlund ranges Mannaja among stories obeying the "Tragic Mercenary” plot where the pursuit of a monetary motive entails the killing or wounding of someone close to the hero, who then sets out on a vengeance mission. This story appears in the very influential Django. In the case of Blade his economic arrangement with the man he should have killed sets off a course of action leading to him being tortured and to the death of the showgirl Angela, who loves him. The situation where a kidnapped woman betrays her savior because she is the lover of her would-be abductor also appears in Ten Thousand Dollars for a Massacre - another "Tragic Mercenary” story.

Notes

References

External links

Swedish video cover from 1982

Films directed by Sergio Martino
1977 Western (genre) films
Spaghetti Western films
1977 films
Films scored by Guido & Maurizio De Angelis
Progressive rock soundtracks
1977 drama films
1970s Italian films